Essex County Cricket Club is one of eighteen first-class county clubs within the domestic cricket structure of England and Wales. It represents the historic county of Essex. Founded in 1876, the club had minor county status until 1894 when it was promoted to first-class status pending its entry into the County Championship in 1895, since then the team has played in every top-level domestic cricket competition in England. Essex currently play all their home games at the County Cricket Ground, Chelmsford. The club has formerly used other venues throughout the county including Lower Castle Park in Colchester, Valentines Park in Ilford, Leyton Cricket Ground, the Gidea Park Sports Ground in Romford, and Garon Park and Southchurch Park, both in Southend. Its limited overs team is called the Essex Eagles.

Honours

First XI honours
 County Championship (8) – 1979, 1983, 1984, 1986, 1991, 1992, 2017, 2019
Division Two (3) – 2002, 2016, 2021
 Sunday/Pro 40 League (5) – 1981, 1984, 1985, 2005, 2006
Division Two (1) – 2008
 Refuge Assurance Cup (1) - 1989
 Gillette/NatWest/C&G/Friends Provident Trophy (3) – 1985, 1997, 2008
 Twenty20 Cup (1) - 2019
 Benson & Hedges Cup (2) – 1979, 1998
 Bob Willis Trophy (1) – 2020

Second XI honours
 Second XI Championship (1) – 1973; shared (0) -
 Second XI Trophy (0) –
 Minor Counties Championship (0) – ; shared (0) -

Earliest cricket in Essex

It is almost certain that cricket reached Essex by the 16th century and that it developed during the 17th century with inter-parish matches being played. The first definite mention of cricket in connection with the county is a highly controversial match in 1724 between Chingford and Mr Edwin Stead's XI, which is recorded in The Dawn of Cricket by H. T. Waghorn.  The venue is unknown but, if it was at Chingford, it is also the earliest reference to cricket being played in Essex as well as by an Essex team. The game echoed an earlier one in 1718 as the Chingford team refused to play to a finish when Mr Stead's team had the advantage. A court case followed and, as in 1718, it was ordered to be played out presumably so that all wagers could be fulfilled. We know that Lord Chief Justice Pratt presided over the case and that he ordered them to play it out on Dartford Brent, though it is not known if this was the original venue. The game was completed in 1726.

The earliest reference to a team called Essex is in July 1732 when a combined Essex & Herts team played against the London Cricket Club. In July 1737, there was London v Essex at the Artillery Ground, London winning by 45 runs. In a return game at Ilford on 1 August 1737, Essex won by 7 runs. References are then occasional until 1785 when the Hornchurch Cricket Club became prominent. This club had a strong team that was representative of Essex as a county. However, the sources differed among themselves re whether the team should be called Essex or Hornchurch. But there is no doubt that Essex was a First-Class county from 1785 until 1794, after which the county strangely and abruptly disappeared from the records for a long time. An Essex CCC was formed and held fixtures in 1860 and held an Annual General Meeting in 1861, but no further reference is seen until 1876.

Club history

Essex CCC were formed on 14 January 1876 at a meeting in the Shire Hall, Chelmsford. The new club did not become First-Class until 1894, playing its inaugural first-class match on 14, 15 & 16 May 1894 against Leicestershire CCC at Leyton. It was the initial First-Class match played by either club, and Essex failed to win a match against any other county. In 1895, both of these clubs and Warwickshire CCC joined the County Championship. In the club's first championship match, of their first championship season, James Burns scored 114 against Warwickshire at Edgbaston and this was the first century for Essex in First-Class cricket. George Frederick Higgins scored the second championship century for Essex in the same match putting on 205 with Burns for the fourth wicket. The club made a high score of 692 against Somerset with the veteran Bunny Lucas scoring 145, but the most notable feat was by Walter Mead who took 17–119 against Hampshire CCC at Southampton.

Essex improved rapidly from 1895, so that by 1897 they were in the running for the Championship, only losing it when Surrey beat them at Leyton. They fell off after this despite beating a fine Australian team on a dubious pitch in 1899, never finishing higher than sixth between 1899 and 1932. Their batting on Leyton's excellent pitches was generally good with the "Essex Twins" of Perrin and McGahey and the sound and skilful Jack Russell, but the bowling depended too much on Mead, Buckenham and later Douglas and when available Louden.

With the decline of these players, Essex fell to some of their lowest levels ever during the late 1920s. Their bowlers conceded over 40 runs a wicket in 1928 – about the highest ever with uncovered pitches. The emergence of Jack O'Connor, Stan Nichols and when available, the amateur fast bowlers Ken Farnes and Hopper Read, though, made Essex during the 1930s a dangerous if inconsistent side. They finished as high as fourth in 1933, and owing to their pace bowling maintained almost as high a standard up to the outbreak of war. The batting, however, tended to depend too much upon O'Connor and a number of amateurs who were rarely available, and Essex lost too many games to break the North's stronghold on the Championship.

After World War II Essex fell off, taking their first wooden spoon in 1950. During this period it was left to Trevor Bailey to do all the pace bowling, and he was often unavailable due to Test calls, whilst spinner Peter Smith was frequently overbowled until he retired in 1951 – thus a strong batting line-up led by Bailey and Doug Insole could seldom win games. Not until 1957 did Essex come back into the top half of the table, but Bailey and Barry Knight never had support of sufficient class to permit them to reach the top of the table, even when Robin Hobbs became England's last successful leg-spinner late in the 1960s.

In the 1970s, with overseas players now permitted, Essex were able to gradually strengthen their team to achieve much more than they ever had before. This decade saw the advent of Graham Gooch, one of England's finest opening batsmen, even though he began his Test career with a pair against Australia in 1975. He didn't return to the England team until 1978, but after a slow start began to assert his dominance over Test bowlers as he had on the county scene. Dedicated to training, he forced his burly physique through a tough regime to prolong his career long after some of his contemporaries had retired.

Along with Gooch, county captain and England batsman Keith Fletcher built a powerful eleven in the late 1970s that dominated domestic cricket from 1979 to 1992, when Essex won six of thirteen County Championship titles. The bowling in the first half of this period was borne by tireless left arm seamer John Lever and spinner and prankster Ray East. The South African Ken McEwan and Fletcher were the best batsmen after Gooch. As Lever declined, England all rounder Derek Pringle and fast bowler Neil Foster took over, whilst John Childs crossed from Gloucestershire to take over as the chief spinner.

In the 1990s, Essex had more internationals, including Nasser Hussain, who captained England in several series. Bowlers Mark Ilott and Peter Such earned caps, as well as wicket keeper James Foster.  Ashley Cowan toured the West Indies in 1997/98 without playing an international match.  Essex were also able to sign England fast bowlers Darren Gough and Alex Tudor, after they left Yorkshire and Surrey respectively.

Led by all-rounder Ronnie Irani Essex won the National League Division 1 title in 2005, their first major title in eight years.

In 2006, Essex successfully defended their National League title in the newly rebranded Pro40 format by the narrowest of margins, having tied for the title on points. The club missed out on promotion in the County Championship only on the last day of the season, losing to Leicestershire while their rivals Worcestershire beat Northamptonshire. In that season's Twenty20 Cup Essex beat Yorkshire to reach the semi-finals at Trent Bridge, where they were beaten by eventual tournament winners Leicestershire. Essex also had Twenty20 success in the first floodlit Twenty20 Tournament, held between the four teams with permanent floodlights, in a series of 2 legged matches. Essex beat Derbyshire 1–0, after the first leg was washed out, and they won the second leg convincingly.

Essex was promoted back to Division one for the 2010 season.  Essex won the County Championship in 2017 and 2019, and won the Bob Willis Trophy in 2020. Essex won the 2019 T20 Blast, beating Worcestershire Rapids in the final. Captain and player of the match Simon Harmer hit the winning runs and took 3-16.

Home grounds

The club currently plays all its home games at Chelmsford – Colchester's cricket festival has been suspended since the 2017 season.

 County Cricket Ground, Chelmsford
 Lower Castle Park, Colchester

Players

Current squad
 No. denotes the player's squad number, as worn on the back of their shirt.
  denotes players with international caps.
  denotes a player who has been awarded a county cap.

Essex players with international caps
Essex county cricketers who have during their career also represented their national team in Test cricket, One Day International cricket or Twenty20 International cricket.

England
 Ronnie Irani
 Graham Gooch
 Keith Fletcher
 Jack Russell
 Stan Nichols
 Ravi Bopara
 Nasser Hussain
 Alastair Cook
 Barry Knight
 James Foster
 Neil Foster
 Nick Knight
 Darren Gough
 Paul Grayson
 Adam Hollioake
 Mark Ilott
 Alex Tudor
 Jason Gallian
 John Lever
 Walter Mead
 Claude Buckenham
 Jack O'Connor
 Johnny Douglas
 Frederick Fane
 Charlie McGahey
 Paul Gibb
 Mike Denness
 Aftab Habib
 John Stephenson
 Jim Laker
 Derek Pringle
 Martin Saggers
 Peter Such
 Owais Shah
 Sajid Mahmood
 Reece Topley
 Monty Panesar
 Tymal Mills
 Ben Foakes
 Trevor Bailey
 John Childs
 Doug Insole
 Peter Smith
 Ken Farnes
 Neil Williams
 Sailor Young
 Hopper Read
 Tom Westley
 Dan Lawrence

India
 Harbhajan Singh
 Murali Vijay
 Gautam Gambhir

Bangladesh
 Tamim Iqbal

Australia
 Mark Waugh
 Andy Bichel
 Bruce Francis
 Michael Kasprowicz
 Stuart Law
 Allan Border
 Merv Hughes
 Bryce McGain
 Robert Quiney
 Shaun Tait
 Peter Siddle
 Adam Zampa
 Mark Steketee
 Daniel Sams

Pakistan
 Mohammad Akram
 Mohammad Amir
 Danish Kaneria
 Saleem Malik
 Wahab Riaz
 Sadiq Mohammad

Netherlands
 Ryan ten Doeschate
 Shane Snater

Zimbabwe
 Andy Flower
 Grant Flower

South Africa
 Hashim Amla
 Simon Harmer
 Lee Irvine
 Dale Steyn
 André Nel
 Lonwabo Tsotsobe
 Alviro Petersen
 Charl Willoughby

West Indies
 Keith Boyce
 Bertie Clarke
 Norbert Phillip
 Dwayne Bravo

New Zealand
 Andre Adams
 Chris Martin
 Tim Southee
 Scott Styris
 James Franklin
 Hamish Rutherford
 Jesse Ryder
 Neil Wagner
 Jimmy Neesham

Records

Most first-class runs for Essex 
Qualification – 20,000 runs

Most first-class wickets for Essex 
Qualification – 1,000 wickets

References

Further reading
H. S. Altham, A History of Cricket, Volume 1 (to 1914), George Allen & Unwin, 1962
Derek Birley, A Social History of English Cricket, Aurum, 1999
Rowland Bowen, Cricket: A History of its Growth and Development, Eyre & Spottiswoode, 1970
H. T. Waghorn, The Dawn of Cricket, Electric Press, 1906
Roy Webber, The Playfair Book of Cricket Records, Playfair Books, 1951
Playfair Cricket Annual – various editions
Wisden Cricketers' Almanack – various editions
Nasser Hussain Playing With Fire, Penguin 2005

External links
Essex CCC website
Essex CCC official shop

 
Cricket clubs established in 1876
English first-class cricket teams
History of Essex
1876 establishments in England

Sports clubs in Essex
Sport in Chelmsford